Kafi ol Molk (also Romanized as Kāfī ol Molk, Kāfī el Molk, and Kāfī ol Melak; also known as Kafal’myul’k, Kaflomolk, Kaif al Mulk, and Maḩalleh-ye Kāfī ol Malek) is a village in Guney-ye Markazi Rural District, in the Central District of Shabestar County, East Azerbaijan Province, Iran. At the 2006 census, its population was 1,340, in 415 families.

References 

Populated places in Shabestar County